Park Jong-sin (born 10 December 1962) is a South Korean sport shooter who competed in the 1988 Summer Olympics and in the 1992 Summer Olympics.

References

1962 births
Living people
South Korean male sport shooters
ISSF pistol shooters
Olympic shooters of South Korea
Shooters at the 1988 Summer Olympics
Shooters at the 1992 Summer Olympics